Hafey is a surname. Notable people with the surname include:

Bud Hafey (1912–1986), American baseball player
Chick Hafey (1903–1973), American baseball player
Tom Hafey (1931–2014), Australian rules football player and coach
Tom Hafey (baseball) (1913–1996), American baseball player
William Hafey (1888–1954), American Roman Catholic bishop